The Daytona Aircraft D-200 is one of a series of American training aircraft developed in the 1990s by Daytona Aircraft.

Development
The DA-200 is a two place side-by-side configuration, low wing aircraft with tricycle landing gear and gull wing doors. It features a double tapered wing, similar to a Mooney 201, and a swept tail with dorsal fin similar to a Cessna 172. The aircraft uses all aluminum construction. It was the first demonstrated in a line of aircraft intended to be built in Fargo, North Dakota. The producers hoped to capitalize on the lack of prior manufacturing liability.

Variants
D-160
D-180
D-200
Two seat prototype
D-250
D-270
D-300

Specifications (D-200)

See also

References

D-200
1990s United States civil trainer aircraft
Single-engined tractor aircraft
High-wing aircraft